Brahmaputra Degree College, established in 1993, is a general degree college situated at Bokulguri, in Lakhimpur district, Assam. This college is affiliated with the Dibrugarh University.

Department

Arts
Assamese
English
History
Physical Education
Economics
Philosophy
Political Science
Geography

References

External links
http://www.brahmaputradegreecollege.edu.in/

Universities and colleges in Assam
Colleges affiliated to Dibrugarh University
Educational institutions established in 1993
1993 establishments in Assam